Jimmy Høyer (born January 8, 1978) is a Danish professional football midfielder who currently plays for Icelandic team Knattspyrnufélagið Víkingur.

References

External links
Career stats at Danmarks Radio

1978 births
Living people
Danish men's footballers
AaB Fodbold players
Aarhus Gymnastikforening players
Knattspyrnufélagið Víkingur players
Danish Superliga players
Association football fullbacks
Danish expatriates in Iceland
Association football midfielders
Expatriate footballers in Iceland

Association football defenders